Grand National Night is a 1953 British thriller film brought to the screen by George Minter, produced by Phil C. Samuel, and based on a play of the same title written by Campbell and Dorothy Christie. It was directed by Bob McNaught and starred Nigel Patrick, Moira Lister and Beatrice Campbell (Patrick's wife) with support from Michael Hordern, Noel Purcell and a cameo role from Colin Gordon.

The film was shot at Walton Studios near London. The film's sets were designed by the art director Frederick Pusey. Cinematography was by Jack Asher.

Previous to this film version Grand National Night had been presented as a BBC Radio serial as well as the original stage play, which was produced in 1945 and 1946. The cast of the original play was headed by Leslie Banks as Gerald Coates.

Plot
Racehorse trainer Gerald Coates argues with his alcoholic wife Babs on the evening after his horse has won the Grand National. She attacks him with a knife and there is a struggle with the knife. As a result she becomes fatally wounded. He drives her to Liverpool to try and get her medical attention, but he discovers that she had died and leaves her in the car which belongs to a friend of hers. He takes a train home and waits for a police investigation.

Cast
Nigel Patrick as Gerald Coates  
Moira Lister as Babs Coates  
Beatrice Campbell as Joyce Penrose  
Betty Ann Davies as Pinkie Collins  
Michael Hordern as Inspector Ayling  
Noel Purcell as Philip Balfour  
Leslie Mitchell as Jack Donovan  
Barry MacKay as Sergeant Gibson  
Colin Gordon as Buns Darling  
Gibb McLaughlin as Morton  
Richard Grayden as Chandler  
May Hallatt as Hoskyns  
George Sequira as George  
Ernest Jay as railway official  
Russell Waters as plainclothes detective
George Rose as plainclothes detective
Arthur Howard as Hotel Manager 
Edward Evans as garage attendant

Reception
David Parkinson of Radio Times gave the film 3 stars out of 5.

Notes

External links

1950s thriller films
British thriller films
British films based on plays
Films shot at Nettlefold Studios
Allied Artists films
Films set in England
British horse racing films
1950s English-language films
1950s British films